Ispat High Schools are a group of Indian high schools in Rourkela, Odisha.

They are run by the administration of the Steel Authority of India Limited (Rourkela Steel Plant) as a part of their corporate social responsibility.

Campuses
These schools have campuses in Rourkela's sectors 16,7,  2 and 4.

In 2010, the school at Sector 16 was opened as a new school that is affiliated to the Central Board of Secondary Education pattern of education.

See also

 List of schools in Odisha

References

Primary schools in India
High schools and secondary schools in Odisha
Schools in Rourkela
Educational institutions in India with year of establishment missing